Matúš Macík (born 19 May 1993) is a Slovak professional footballer who plays for SK Sigma Olomouc as a goalkeeper.

Club career
He made his professional Fortuna Liga debut for Ružomberok against Skalica on 18 July 2015.

References

External links
 MFK Ružomberok official profile
 Fortuna Liga profile
 Futbalnet profile
 

1993 births
Living people
Sportspeople from Liptovský Mikuláš
Slovak footballers
Association football goalkeepers
MFK Tatran Liptovský Mikuláš players
MFK Ružomberok players
Slovak Super Liga players
2. Liga (Slovakia) players
SK Sigma Olomouc players